Rafferty Rides a Winner (1961) is a novel for children by Australian author Joan Woodberry, illustrated by the author. It was joint winner of the Children's Book of the Year Award: Older Readers in 1962.

Plot outline

Rafferty, an English boy attempting to learn how to become Australian, and his friends attempt to scrape together 60 pounds via a series of various means in order to purchase a boat.

Critical reception

While covering a selection of recent books for children in The Canberra Times in 1962, a reviewer was not at all impressed with the book: "Its plot and characters, similar to the previous two books by Miss Woodberry, follow the cheap "formula" pattern of the comic book, in which a group of slick youngsters, chattering a lot of slick slang, embark on a series of slick adventures. It offers only escape entertainment of the most mediocre kind."

See also
 1961 in Australian literature

References

Australian children's novels
1961 Australian novels
Novels set in Australia
CBCA Children's Book of the Year Award-winning works
1961 children's books